Borj-e Qaleh (also Romanized as Borj-e Qal’eh and Borj Qal’eh; also known as Borjī Qal‘eh) is a village in Shahrestaneh Rural District, Now Khandan District, Dargaz County, Razavi Khorasan Province, Iran. At the 2006 census, its population was 393, in 93 families.

References 

Populated places in Dargaz County